Panama competed at the 2022 World Games held in Birmingham, United States from 7 to 17 July 2022. Athletes representing Panama won one bronze medal and the country finished in 70th place in the medal table.

Medalists

Invitational sports

Competitors
The following is the list of number of competitors in the Games.

Flag football

Panama won one bronze medal in flag football.

Ju-jitsu

Panama competed in ju-jitsu.

Karate

Panama competed in karate.

References

Nations at the 2022 World Games
World Games
World Games